The following television stations broadcast on digital channel 19 in the United States:

 K19AA-D in Altus, Oklahoma
 K19AU-D in Omak, Okanogan, etc., Washington
 K19BK-D in Lakeview, Oregon
 K19BU-D in Pahrump, Nevada
 K19BY-D in Grangeville, etc., Idaho
 K19CG-D in Belle Fourche, South Dakota
 K19CM-D in Farmington, New Mexico
 K19CV-D in Redwood Falls, Minnesota, on virtual channel 29, which rebroadcasts WFTC
 K19CX-D in Yuma, Arizona
 K19CY-D in Rockland, Idaho
 K19DI-D in Crowley Lake - Long, California
 K19DQ-D in Montpelier, Idaho
 K19DS-D in Pitkin, Colorado
 K19DU-D in Summit County, Utah
 K19DY-D in Canon City, Colorado
 K19EC-D in Mapleton, Oregon
 K19EG-D in Holyoke, Colorado, on virtual channel 6, which rebroadcasts KRMA-TV
 K19EI-D in Pacific City/Cloverdale, Oregon, on virtual channel 7, which rebroadcasts KOAC-TV
 K19EU-D in Winnemucca, Nevada
 K19EW-D in Preston, Idaho, on virtual channel 13, which rebroadcasts KSTU
 K19EY-D in Myton, Utah
 K19FD-D in Camp Verde, Arizona
 K19FF-D in Miles City, Montana
 K19FG-D in Jackson, Wyoming
 K19FH-D in Aspen, Colorado
 K19FX-D in Laramie, Wyoming
 K19FY-D in Chico, California
 K19FZ-D in Elko, Nevada
 K19GA-D in Susanville, etc., California
 K19GB-D in Dove Creek, etc., Colorado, on virtual channel 19
 K19GD-D in Kalispell & Lakeside, Montana
 K19GH-D in Eugene, etc., Oregon
 K19GJ-D in Hatch, Utah
 K19GL-D in Yreka, California
 K19GM-D in Circleville, Utah
 K19GN-D in Mount Pleasant, Utah, on virtual channel 4, which rebroadcasts KTVX
 K19GS-D in Rural Beaver, etc., Utah
 K19GX-D in Buffalo, Wyoming
 K19HA-D in Navajo Mtn.Sch., etc., Utah
 K19HB-D in Oljeto, Utah
 K19HC-D in Hoehne, Colorado
 K19HE-D in Bluff, Utah
 K19HG-D in Redstone, Colorado
 K19HH-D in Midland, etc., Oregon
 K19HJ-D in Pinedale, etc., Wyoming
 K19HQ-D in Virgin, Utah
 K19HS-D in Grants Pass, Oregon
 K19HU-D in Montezuma Ck & Aneth, Utah
 K19HZ-D in Jackson, Minnesota
 K19IC-D in Eureka, California
 K19ID-D in Green River, Utah
 K19IG-D in Mexican Hat, etc., Utah
 K19IH-D in Willmar, Minnesota, on virtual channel 42, which rebroadcasts KSAX
 K19IM-D in Duckwater, Nevada
 K19IP-D in Flagstaff, Arizona, on virtual channel 19
 K19IS-D in Inyokern, California, on virtual channel 21, which rebroadcasts KZGN-LD
 K19IU-D in Battle Mountain, Nevada
 K19IX-D in Romeo, Colorado
 K19JA-D in Cortez, Colorado
 K19JC-D in Mazama, Washington
 K19JJ-D in Vale, Oregon
 K19JM-D in Emigrant, Montana
 K19JO-D in Harlowton, etc., Montana
 K19JQ-D in Big Sandy, Montana
 K19JR-D in Wolf Point, Montana
 K19JW-D in Mauna Loa, Hawaii
 K19JX-D in Yakima, Washington
 K19JZ-D in Carlsbad, New Mexico
 K19KE-D in Jolly, Texas
 K19KN-D in Eads, etc., Colorado
 K19KP-D in Hermiston, Oregon
 K19KT-D in Hobbs, New Mexico
 K19KU-D in Walla Walla, Washington
 K19KV-D in Prescott, Arizona
 K19KW-D in Greybull, Wyoming
 K19KX-D in Keokuk, Iowa
 K19KY-D in Pocatello, Idaho
 K19LA-D in Rocky Ford, Colorado
 K19LC-D in Pagosa Springs, Colorado
 K19LD-D in Bayfield, Colorado
 K19LF-D in Koosharem, Utah
 K19LG-D in Rural Garfield County, Utah
 K19LH-D in Teasdale, etc., Utah
 K19LI-D in St. James, Minnesota
 K19LJ-D in Frost, Minnesota
 K19LK-D in Panguitch, Utah
 K19LL-D in Henrieville, Utah
 K19LM-D in Cody/Powell, Wyoming
 K19LN-D in Mayfield, Utah
 K19LO-D in Rural Sevier County, Utah
 K19LP-D in Clovis, New Mexico
 K19LR-D in Huntsville, etc., Utah, on virtual channel 30, which rebroadcasts KUCW
 K19LS-D in Walker Lake, Nevada
 K19LT-D in Prineville, etc., Oregon
 K19LU-D in Cedar City, Utah, on virtual channel 16, which rebroadcasts KUPX-TV
 K19LV-D in St. George, Utah, on virtual channel 9, which rebroadcasts KUEN
 K19LW-D in Sterling, Colorado, on virtual channel 9, which rebroadcasts KUSA
 K19LY-D in Scipio, Utah
 K19LZ-D in Las Cruces & Organ, New Mexico
 K19MA-D in Leamington, Utah
 K19MC-D in Bonnerdale, Arkansas
 K19MD-D in Orangeville, Utah, on virtual channel 9, which rebroadcasts KUEN
 K19ME-D in Overton, Nevada
 K19MF-D in East Carbon County, Utah
 K19MG-D in Rawlins, Wyoming
 K19MH-D in Fruitland, Nevada
 K19MI-D in Salem, Oregon, on virtual channel 49, which rebroadcasts K18EL-D
 K19MJ-D in Yerington, Nevada
 K19MK-D in Lake Tahoe, Nevada
 K19ML-D in Wray, Colorado, on virtual channel 7, which rebroadcasts KMGH-TV
 K19MM-D in Ruth, Nevada
 K19MN-D in Lake George, Colorado
 K19MP-D in Gallup, New Mexico
 K19MS-D in Alexandra, Minnesota
 K19MZ-D in Arriba, Colorado
 K19NB-D in Gustine, California
 K19NE-D in Gateway, Colorado
 K19NF-D in Socorro, New Mexico
 K43MB-D in Orderville, Utah
 KAJN-CD in Lafayette, Louisiana
 KAMR-TV in Amarillo, Texas
 KARD in West Monroe, Louisiana
 KAUT-TV in Oklahoma City, Oklahoma, an ATSC 3.0 station
 KBBV-CD in Bakersfield, California
 KBCB in Bellingham, Washington, on virtual channel 24
 KBJR-TV in Superior, Wisconsin
 KCBB-LD in Boise, Idaho
 KCKA in Centralia, Washington, on virtual channel 15
 KCKS-LD in Kansas City, Kansas, on virtual channel 25
 KCOY-TV in Santa Maria, California
 KDMI in Des Moines, Iowa
 KDOS-LD in Globe, Arizona
 KFBI-LD in Medford, Oregon
 KGBS-CD in Austin, Texas
 KGRX-LD in Gila River Indian Community, Arizona, an ATSC 3.0 station, on virtual channel 19
 KHDF-CD in Las Vegas, Nevada
 KIDY in San Angelo, Texas
 KIKU in Honolulu, Hawaii
 KIPB-LD in Pine Bluff, Arkansas
 KJYK-LD in Beaumont, Texas
 KJZZ-TV in Salt Lake City, Utah, an ATSC 3.0 station, on virtual channel 14
 KKTW-LD in Minneapolis, Minnesota, on virtual channel 19
 KLBB-LD in Lubbock, Texas
 KLDO-TV in Laredo, Texas
 KMBY-LD in Templeton, California
 KMOH-TV in Kingman, Arizona
 KMPH-CD in Merced-Mariposa, California
 KMUM-CD in Sacramento, California, on virtual channel 33, which rebroadcasts KCSO-LD
 KOBS-LD in San Antonio, Texas
 KOTV-DT in McAlester, Oklahoma
 KPBS in San Diego, California, on virtual channel 15
 KPIC in Roseburg, Oregon
 KPRY-TV in Pierre, South Dakota
 KPTN-LD in St. Louis, Missouri, on virtual channel 7
 KRMA-TV (DRT) in Fort Collins, Colorado, on virtual channel 6
 KSBS-CD in Denver, Colorado, on virtual channel 10, which rebroadcasts KCDO-TV
 KSCC in Corpus Christi, Texas
 KSTS in San Jose, California, on virtual channel 48
 KTEV-LD in Texarkana, Arkansas
 KTGF-LD in Great Falls, Montana
 KTTU in Tucson, Arizona
 KTVT in Fort Worth, Texas, on virtual channel 11
 KTXH in Houston, Texas, on virtual channel 20
 KUES in Richfield, Utah, on virtual channel 19, which rebroadcasts KUED
 KUFS-LD in Fort Smith, Arkansas
 KUMN-LD in Moses Lake, etc., Washington
 KVBA-LD in Alamogordo, New Mexico
 KVRR in Fargo, North Dakota
 KWCH-DT in Hutchinson, Kansas
 KWKS in Colby, Kansas
 KWWE-LD in Lake Charles, Louisiana
 KWYB in Butte, Montana
 KXMA-TV in Dickinson, North Dakota
 KXNE-TV in Norfolk, Nebraska
 KYTV in Springfield, Missouri
 W19CO-D in Pensacola, Florida
 W19DB-D in Franklin, North Carolina
 W19DN-D in Macon, Georgia
 W19DP-D in La Crosse, Wisconsin
 W19DW-D in Columbus, Georgia
 W19EE-D in Jacksonville, Illinois
 W19EF-D in Greenville, Mississippi
 W19EN-D in River Falls, Wisconsin
 W19EP-D in Culebra, Puerto Rico
 W19ET-D in Bath, New York
 W19EY-D in Toa Baja, Puerto Rico, on virtual channel 25
 W19EZ-D in Houghton Lake, Michigan
 W19FA-D in Bangor, Maine
 W19FB-D in Traverse City, Michigan
 W19FD-D in Terre Haute, Indiana
 WANF in Atlanta, Georgia, on virtual channel 46
 WBPI-CD in Augusta, Georgia
 WBWP-LD in West Palm Beach, Florida
 WBYD-CD in Pittsburgh, Pennsylvania, on virtual channel 39
 WCLL-CD in Columbus, Ohio, on virtual channel 19
 WCZU-LD in Bowling Green, Kentucky
 WDKY-TV in Danville, Kentucky
 WDSU in New Orleans, Louisiana
 WECY-LD in Elmira, New York
 WEPA-LD in Erie, Pennsylvania
 WESH (DRT) in Ocala, Florida, on virtual channel 2
 WEYW-LP in Key West, Florida, on virtual channel 19
 WFND-LD in Findlay, Ohio
 WFTV (DRT) in Deltona, Florida, on virtual channel 9
 WGN-TV in Chicago, Illinois, on virtual channel 9
 WGSR-LD in Reidsville, North Carolina
 WHNT-TV in Huntsville, Alabama
 WIIQ in Demopolis, Alabama
 WIPB in Muncie, Indiana, on virtual channel 49
 WIYC in Troy, Alabama
 WJAX-TV in Jacksonville, Florida
 WKPZ-CD in Kingsport, Tennessee
 WKYC in Cleveland, Ohio, on virtual channel 3
 WLLC-LD in Nashville, Tennessee, on virtual channel 42
 WLWK-CD in Sturgeon Bay, Wisconsin
 WMMF-LD in Vero Beach, Florida
 WMTV in Madison, Wisconsin
 WODR-LD in Wausau, Wisconsin
 WOOT-LD in Chattanooga, Tennessee
 WPED-LD in Jackson, Tennessee
 WPSD-TV in Paducah, Kentucky
 WQTO in Ponce, Puerto Rico, on virtual channel 26
 WRUE-LD in Salisbury, Maryland
 WSBS-CD in Miami, etc., Florida, on virtual channel 22, which rebroadcasts WSBS-TV
 WSFJ-TV in London, Ohio, uses WCLL-CD's spectrum, on virtual channel 51
 WSIO-LD in Galesburg, Illinois
 WSOC-TV in Charlotte, North Carolina, on virtual channel 9
 WSPZ-LD in DuBois, Pennsylvania
 WSTM-TV in Syracuse, New York, and ATSC 3.0 station.
 WSYT in Syracuse, New York
 WTKJ-LD in Watertown, New York
 WTLH in Bainbridge, Georgia
 WTOG in St. Petersburg, Florida, on virtual channel 44
 WTPX-TV in Antigo, Wisconsin
 WUNC-TV (DRT) in Raleigh, North Carolina, on virtual channel 4
 WUTF-TV at Worcester, Massachusetts, on virtual channel 27
 WVGN-LD in Charlotte Amalie, U.S. Virgin Islands
 WXMI in Grand Rapids, Michigan
 WYDO in Greenville, North Carolina
 WYPX-TV in Amsterdam, New York
 WZBJ-CD in Lynchburg, Virginia
 WZMQ in Marquette, Michigan

The following stations, which are no longer licensed, formerly broadcast on digital channel 19 in the United States:
 K19LX-D in Granite Falls, Minnesota
 K19MB-D in Mountain Home, Idaho
 K19NA-D in Idaho Falls, Idaho
 KFJK-LD in Santa Fe, New Mexico
 KGHZ in Springfield, Missouri
 KJII-LD in Lincoln, Nebraska
 KNTS-LP in Natchitoches, Louisiana
 W19DD-D in Brevard, North Carolina
 W19DV-D in Luquillo, Puerto Rico
 W19EB-D in Lumberton, Mississippi
 WBKI-TV in Campbellsville, Kentucky
 WDXA-LD in Florence, South Carolina
 WEMW-CD in Greensburg, Pennsylvania
 WFKB-LD in Midland, Michigan

References

19 digital